Mary R. Cathcart (born August 28, 1942) is an American politician from Maine. Cathcart served as a Democratic State Senator from Maine's 32nd District, representing part of Penobscot County, including the population centers of Orono and Lincoln. She was first elected to the Maine State Senate in 1996 after serving from 1988 to 1994 in the Maine House of Representatives.

Personal
Cathcart earned a B.A. from Rhodes College in 1963 and completed graduate coursework at Vanderbilt University.

References

1942 births
Living people
People from Greenwood, Mississippi
Democratic Party Maine state senators
Democratic Party members of the Maine House of Representatives
Rhodes College alumni
Vanderbilt University alumni
People from Orono, Maine
Women state legislators in Maine
21st-century American politicians
21st-century American women politicians